Alejandro Catena Marugán (born 28 October 1994) is a Spanish professional footballer who plays for Rayo Vallecano as a central defender.

Club career
Catena was born in Móstoles, Madrid, and represented CD Móstoles URJC as a youth. He made his first-team debut during the 2012–13 season, achieving promotion to Tercera División.

On 28 July 2016, Catena signed for Segunda División B side CDA Navalcarnero. The following 28 June, he moved to fellow league team Marbella FC.

On 25 June 2018, Catena agreed to a three-year deal for CF Reus Deportiu in Segunda División. He made his professional debut on 19 August, starting in a 0–2 away loss against UD Las Palmas.

Catena scored his first professional goal on 21 October 2018, netting the equalizer in a 2–1 home defeat of CF Rayo Majadahonda. The following January, he terminated his contract with the Catalans due to the club's poor financial situation overall.

On 31 January 2019, free agent Catena signed a 18-month deal with La Liga side Rayo Vallecano.

Career statistics

Club

References

External links

1994 births
Living people
Spanish footballers
Footballers from the Community of Madrid
Association football defenders
La Liga players
Segunda División players
Segunda División B players
Tercera División players
Divisiones Regionales de Fútbol players
CD Móstoles URJC players
CDA Navalcarnero players
Marbella FC players
CF Reus Deportiu players
Rayo Vallecano players